Henryka Słomczewska-Nowak (25 April 1915 – 12 June 1998) was a Polish athlete and handball player. She competed in the women's long jump at the 1948 Summer Olympics.

References

1915 births
1998 deaths
Athletes (track and field) at the 1948 Summer Olympics
Polish female long jumpers
Olympic athletes of Poland
Sportspeople from Łódź
Polish female handball players
20th-century Polish women